Philippe André Eugène, Baron Bodson (2 November 1944 – 4 April 2020) was a Belgian businessman and politician. He served in the Belgian Senate from 1999 to 2003.

Education
Bodson graduated as civil engineer at the University of Liège (ULg) and obtained a Master of Business Administration at INSEAD (Fontainebleau, France)

Career
Bodson started his career at McKinsey in Paris where he worked for three years. He then worked for four years for the Daus Bank in Germany and the United States. In 1977, he started working for Glaverbel, where he would be the CEO from 1980 until 1989. From September 1989 until December 1998, he was a non-executive member of the board of directors of Fortis. From 1999 until 2003, he was a senator in the Belgian Senate for the Mouvement reformateur. From 2004 until 2010, he was a Director at Fortis. In 2001, he was Chief Executive Officer of Lernout & Hauspie Speech Product.

In the past he was a member of the think tank Coudenberg group.

Death
Bodson died 4 April 2020 from COVID-19.

References

External links
 Philippe Bodson
 Statement by Mr. Philippe Bodson on His Nomination as CEO of Lernout and Hauspie
 Speech for Philippe Bodson - FFPI Conference
 Bio of Philippe Bodson as Chairperson of BeCapital, a cleantech private equity fund 
 Coronavirus : Philippe Bodson, ex-patron de Tractebel, de la FEB et Glaverbel, est décédé ce matin

1944 births
2020 deaths
Members of the Senate (Belgium)
Belgian businesspeople
Officers of the Order of the Crown (Belgium)
University of Liège alumni
INSEAD alumni
Deaths from the COVID-19 pandemic in Belgium